Ibrahim M. El-Sherbiny is an Egyptian Professor of Nanomaterials and Nanomedicine at the University of Science and Technology Zewail City, Egypt. He is the Director of Nanoscience Program and the Center for Materials Science of the institution.  He is a member Biomedical Engineering Society and a Fellow of Royal Society of Chemistry.

Education

Ibrahim M. El-Sherbiny obtained his BSc in chemistry  and his master's degree in polymers from Mansoura University. He moved to Massey University, New Zealand and obtain his PhD in smart drug delivery in 2007.

Career 
El-Sherbiny was a post-doctoral fellow in three different universities; Michigan University, University of New Mexico and Texas University, United States between 2008 and 2010. From 2010 to 2011,  he became a Research Assistant Professor at the latter University. He is currently the Professor of Nanomaterials Science and Director of the Center for Materials Science at Zewail City of Science and Technology, Egypt.

Awards and scholarships 
In 2009, he was awarded a Fulbright Fellowship from the University of Michigan and in 2011, his name got featured on Who's Who in the World (28th Edition). In 2012, he received Prestigious STATE Incentive Award in Science given by the National Academy of Scientific Research, Egypt. In 2013, he was awarded the Venice Goda Award for Scientific Creativity for Young Researchers in the field of Materials Science and its Applications also by National Academy of Scientific Research, Egypt.

Memberships 
He became a member of the Egyptian Society for Polymer Science & Technology (ESPST) in 2007, American Association of Pharmaceutical Scientists (AAPS) in 2008, Biomedical Engineering Society (BMES), USA in 2009 and Egyptian Chemical Society in 2011. In 2012, he co founded the Egyptian Organization for Scientific Research and Technology. He became a member of Egyptian-American Scientists Association (EASA)- Medical Committee, a member of American Royal Society, Science Age Society (SAS) and Materials Research Society in 2010, 2012 and 2013 respectively.

References 

Living people
Egyptian scientists
Egyptian academics
Egyptian academic administrators
Massey University alumni
Mansoura University alumni
Year of birth missing (living people)
Fulbright alumni